Arkansas's at-large congressional district was a congressional district for the United States House of Representatives in Arkansas from 1836 to 1885.

Upon achieving statehood, Arkansas elected its sole representative statewide at-large. For two Congresses in the mid- to late-19th century, Arkansas elected one of its representatives statewide on a general ticket, with the remaining elected from districts

List of members representing the district

References 

 Election Statistics 1920-present Clerk of the House of Representatives

 Congressional Biographical Directory of the United States 1774–present

At-large
Former congressional districts of the United States
At-large United States congressional districts